1799 in sports describes the year's events in world sport.

Boxing
Events
 Jack Bartholomew retained his English Championship title but no fights involving him are recorded in 1799.

Cricket
Events
 An indication of how cricket was spreading throughout India can be observed in the formation of a cricket club at Seringapatam immediately following the successful British siege which ended the rule of Tipu Sultan
 The number of matches played in England continued to decline due to the impact of the Napoleonic Wars.
England
 Most runs – Tom Walker 239
 Most wickets – Thomas Lord 16

Horse racing
England
 The Derby – Archduke
 The Oaks – Bellina
 St Leger Stakes – Cockfighter

References

 
1799